The 18th Golden Bell Awards was held on 23 March 1983 at the Sun Yat-sen Memorial Hall in Taipei, Taiwan. The ceremony was broadcast by Chinese Television System (CTS).

Winners

References

1983
1983 in Taiwan